Mount Franklin is located  northeast of Arthur's Pass, and is the second tallest of the New Zealand mountains with this name. It forms part of the ridge of the Southern Alps. As such, it is located close to the border between the Canterbury and West Coast regions. It is regarded as a good mountain to climb.

References

Mountains of Canterbury, New Zealand
Southern Alps
Arthur's Pass National Park